Pervomaysky is a rural locality (a village) in Shemyaksky Selsoviet, Ufimsky District, Bashkortostan, Russia. The population was 307 as of 2010. There are 4 streets.

Geography 
Pervomaysky is located 46 km west of Ufa (the district's administrative centre) by road. Oktyabrsky is the nearest rural locality.

References 

Rural localities in Ufimsky District